Helmut Bazille (November 19, 1920 – May 5, 1973) was a German politician of the Social Democratic Party (SPD) and member of the German Bundestag.

Life 
Bazille was a member of the German Bundestag from the first Bundestag elections in 1949 to 1969, and since the 1961 Bundestag elections with a direct mandate in the Heilbronn constituency.

Literature

References

1920 births
1973 deaths
Members of the Bundestag for Baden-Württemberg
Members of the Bundestag 1965–1969
Members of the Bundestag 1961–1965
Members of the Bundestag 1957–1961
Members of the Bundestag 1953–1957
Members of the Bundestag 1949–1953
Members of the Bundestag for the Social Democratic Party of Germany